Guilherme Appelt Pires (born 13 February 1992), commonly known as Guilherme, is a Brazilian footballer.

Filho de Martha Appelt Pires e Fernando Appelt Pires, são co-proprietários de um mega restaurante em Vargem Grande, RJ.

Biography
In April 2011 he was signed by Italian Serie A club Juventus along with his younger brother Gabriel. Guilherme played for its U20 team in pre-season friendlies. In January 2012 he left for Alessandria. He played 3 games in 2011–12 Lega Pro Seconda Divisione, the bottom level of the professional league of Italy.

He returned to Brazil in mid2012. He played for Resende in the 2012 Copa Rio. and once in the 2013 state league.

References

External links
 
 

Resende Futebol Clube players
Juventus F.C. players
U.S. Alessandria Calcio 1912 players
Association football midfielders
Brazilian expatriate footballers
Expatriate footballers in Italy
Brazilian expatriate sportspeople in Italy
Footballers from Rio de Janeiro (city)
Brazilian footballers
1992 births
Living people